Gorillas Revisited is a 2006 BBC documentary starring American actress Sigourney Weaver. The role is a call-back to her portrayal of Dian Fossey in Gorillas in the Mist (1988).

Plot
The documentary follows the life of primatologist and conservationist Dian Fossey, recounted by Weaver.

Production
The documentary was filmed in Rwanda.

References

External links
 

2006 films
British documentary films
British television films
Films shot in Rwanda
2000s British films